Detective III Arleigh Eugene McCree (December 24, 1939 – February 8, 1986) was the Commander of the Firearms and Explosives Unit of the Los Angeles Police Department and counter-terrorism specialist, widely recognized as one of the top explosive experts in the world.

LAPD career
McCree investigated the Symbionese Liberation Army bomb making operations in 1976 and was part of the bomb squad that investigated the Marine barracks bombing in Beirut, Lebanon in 1983. A year later, McCree headed the 1984 Los Angeles Olympics bomb squad.  McCree had written a text on explosive devices.  In 1982 he testified before the Senate Judiciary Subcommittee on Security and Terrorism. He said government manuals on how to make bombs were too easy for terrorists to get.

Personal
McCree was also a contributor to Military Police magazine.

Death
McCree was killed along with officer Ronald Ball in a 1986 bomb disposal operation in North Hollywood, California. Both officers were attempting to defuse two pipe bombs in a murder suspect's garage when they both detonated. McCree died instantly, and Ball would die about an hour later.

He is honored among the fallen officers in the line of duty at the National Law Enforcement Officers Memorial in Washington, D.C.

External links
 "Police Aide Tells of Libyan Bid" The New York Times, 29 August 1981.
Obituary

1939 births
1986 deaths
Los Angeles Police Department officers
American police officers killed in the line of duty
Bomb disposal personnel
Deaths by improvised explosive device in the United States
American terrorism victims
Terrorism deaths in California